Çeltikçi District is a district of the Burdur Province of Turkey. Its seat is the town of Çeltikçi. Its area is 161 km2, and its population is 4,936 (2021).

Composition
There is one municipality in Çeltikçi District:
 Çeltikçi

There are 6 villages in Çeltikçi District:
 Bağsaray
 Çebiş
 Güvenli
 Kuzköy
 Ovacık
 Tekkeköy

References

Districts of Burdur Province